Charles Louis Fefferman (born April 18, 1949) is an American mathematician at Princeton University, where he is currently the Herbert E. Jones, Jr. '43 University Professor of Mathematics. He was awarded the Fields Medal in 1978 for his contributions to mathematical analysis.

Early life and education
Fefferman was born to a Jewish family, in Washington, DC. Fefferman was a child prodigy. Fefferman entered the University of Maryland at age 14, and had written his first scientific paper by the age of 15. He graduated with degrees in math and physics at 17, and earned his PhD in mathematics three years later from Princeton University, under Elias Stein. His doctoral dissertation was titled "Inequalities for strongly singular convolution operators". Fefferman achieved a full professorship at the University of Chicago at the age of 22, making him the youngest full professor ever appointed in the United States.

Career
At the age of 25, he returned to Princeton as a full professor, becoming the youngest person to be promoted to the title. He won the Alan T. Waterman Award in 1976 (the first person to get the award) and the Fields Medal in 1978 for his work in mathematical analysis, specifically convergence and divergence. He was elected to the National Academy of Sciences in 1979. He was appointed the Herbert Jones Professor at Princeton in 1984.

In addition to the above, his honors include the Salem Prize in 1971, the Bergman Prize in 1992, the Bôcher Memorial Prize in 2008, and the Wolf Prize in Mathematics for 2017, as well as election to the American Academy of Arts and Sciences and the American Philosophical Society. For 2021 he was awarded the BBVA Foundation Frontiers of Knowledge Award in Basic Sciences.

Fefferman contributed several innovations that revised the study of multidimensional complex analysis by finding fruitful generalisations of classical low-dimensional results. Fefferman's work on partial differential equations, Fourier analysis, in particular convergence, multipliers, divergence, singular integrals and Hardy spaces earned him a Fields Medal at the International Congress of Mathematicians at Helsinki in 1978. He was a Plenary Speaker of the ICM in 1974 in Vancouver.

He has studied mathematical physics, harmonic analysis, fluid dynamics, neural networks, geometry, mathematical finance and spectral analysis, amongst others.

Family
Charles Fefferman and his wife Julie have two daughters, Nina and Lainie. Lainie Fefferman is a composer, taught math at Saint Ann's School and holds a degree in music from Yale University as well as a Ph.D. in music composition from Princeton. She has an interest in Middle Eastern music. Nina Fefferman is a computational biologist residing at the University of Tennessee whose research is concerned with the application of mathematical models to complex biological systems. Charles Fefferman's brother, Robert Fefferman, is also a mathematician and former Dean of the Physical Sciences Division at the University of Chicago.

Works
The following are among Fefferman's best-known papers:

References

External links
 
 
 Charles Fefferman Curriculum Vitae

 
 
 
 
 
 
 
 
 

1949 births
Living people
20th-century American mathematicians
21st-century American mathematicians
Fields Medalists
Complex analysts
American Jews
Mathematical analysts
PDE theorists
Members of the United States National Academy of Sciences
Princeton University faculty
Princeton University alumni
University of Chicago faculty
Jewish American scientists
University of Maryland, College Park alumni
Sloan Research Fellows
Wolf Prize in Mathematics laureates
Mathematicians from Washington, D.C.
Members of the American Philosophical Society